Jakarta Web Services Metadata (JWS; formerly Web Services Metadata for Java platform and Java Web Services), as a part of Jakarta XML Web Services (JAX-WS), is a Java programming language specification (JSR-181) primarily used to standardize the development of web service interfaces for the Jakarta EE platform.

Using annotations from the JSR 181, you can annotate a Web service implementation class or a Web service interface. It enables developers to create portable Java Web Services from a simple plain old Java object (POJO) class by adding annotations, and also helps in generating a Web service with a wizard or by publishing the service on to a server.

Some of the annotations specified by this JSR are:
 @WebService
 @WebMethod
 @Oneway
 @WebParam
 @WebResult
 @HandlerChain
 @SOAPBinding

Put simply, JSR 181 is a specification to define standard and portable web services. It offers the following benefits:
 Provide a simplified model for developing web services
 Abstract the implementation details
 Achieve robustness, easy maintenance, and high interoperability

Version is 2.1 was released on December 15, 2009.

References

References
 

Java enterprise platform
Web service specifications
Java specification requests